Farrel Benito Furtado E Gracias (née Furtado; born 1 November 1961),  simply known as Farrel Furtado is an Indian politician and teacher from Goa. She is a former member of the Goa Legislative Assembly and represented the Velim Assembly constituency. Furtado is the first and only woman M.L.A. to be elected from the Velim constituency.  

Furtado was elected for the term 1989 to 1994. She had contested the 1989 Goa Legislative Assembly election on the Indian National Congress ticket and won against Janata Dal candidate, Minguel Gabriel Rodrigues by a margin of 6706 votes.

Early and personal life
Farrel Benito Furtado was born in East Africa, she completed her studies in Bachelor of Arts, Bachelor of Education, Master of Arts and Bachelor of Laws. She is married to Elvis Gracias and has a son. She resides at Cuncolim, Goa.

Career

Politics
On November 2017, Furtado along with Victor Gonsalves joined Goa Forward Party. In 2021, she joined All India Trinamool Congress.

Sports
Furtado is a former national level field hockey player and captained the Goa hockey team at the nationals. She played an integral role in resuscitating the state women's hockey association and currently serves as the senior vice president at the Goans Hockey Association. She is also a former chairman of the Sarva Shiksha Abhiyan. Furtado was also awarded the International Youth award at Tokyo in the year 1980.

Teaching
Furtado currently is a senior teacher at Maria Bambina Convent High School, Cuncolim.

Felicitation
On 9 January 2014 at the golden jubilee of the Goa State Assembly, Furtado was felicitated along with eight other Goan women legislators.

References

External links
 

1961 births
Living people
Goa MLAs 1989–1994
Indian National Congress politicians from Goa
Goa Forward Party politicians
Trinamool Congress politicians from Goa
20th-century Indian women politicians
21st-century Indian women politicians
People from South Goa district